James Yonge may refer to:

James Yonge (translator), English translator
James Yonge (surgeon) (1647–1721), naval surgeon and physician, FRS
James Yonge (physician) (1794–1870), English physician

See also
James Young (disambiguation)